Jonathan Kpakpo (born 25 December 1942) is a Ghanaian former footballer. He competed in the men's tournament at the 1968 Summer Olympics.

References

1942 births
Living people
Ghanaian footballers
Ghana international footballers
Olympic footballers of Ghana
Footballers at the 1968 Summer Olympics
Footballers from Accra
Association football midfielders